Contrabass (from ) refers to several musical instruments of very low pitch—generally one octave below bass register instruments. While the term most commonly refers to the double bass (which is the bass instrument in the orchestral string family, tuned lower than the cello), many other instruments in the contrabass register exist.

The term "contrabass" is relative, usually denoting a very low-pitched instrument of its type, rather than one in a particular range. For example, the contrabass flute's lowest note is approximately an octave higher than that of the contrabass clarinet. Instruments tuned below contrabass instruments, such as the double contrabass flute or subcontrabass saxophone, may be referred to as "double contrabass," "triple contrabass," "subcontrabass," or "octocontrabass" instruments. On the other hand, the "contrabass" classification often includes such instruments.

Wind

Brass
Contrabass bugle, a variant tuba used in drum and bugle corps
Contrabass hélicon
Contrabass sackbut
Contrabass serpent
Contrabass saxhorn in EE♭ 
Contrabass saxhorn in BB♭
Subcontrabass saxhorn in EEE♭
Subcontrabass saxhorn in BBB♭
Contrabass trombone, in F or BB♭ below the bass trombone
Contrabass trumpet
Subcontrabass tuba in BBB♭

Woodwind
Contrabass clarinet, two octaves below the B♭ soprano clarinet
Octocontralto clarinet, two octaves below the alto clarinet
Subcontralto clarinet, alias of an octocontralto clarinet
Octocontrabass clarinet, three octaves below the B♭ soprano clarinet
Subcontrabass clarinet, alias of an octocontrabass clarinet
Contrabass flute, two octaves below the C concert flute
Subcontrabass flute, two octaves below the alto flute
Double contrabass flute, three octaves below the C concert flute
Hyperbass flute, four octaves below the C concert flute
Contrabass oboe, two octaves below the oboe
Contrabass ocarina, one octave below the bass ocarina in C
Great contrabass pommer
Contrabass rackett
Contrabass recorder, in F, two octaves below the alto/treble recorder
Subcontrabass recorder, in C, three octaves below the soprano/descant recorder
Sub-subcontrabass recorder, in F, three octaves below the alto/treble recorder
Contrabass sarrusophone, range similar to the contrabass saxophone
Contrabass saxophone, two octaves below the alto saxophone
Subcontrabass saxophone, two octaves below the tenor saxophone
Contrabass tin whistle
Contrabass tubax, a saxophone-like instrument two octaves below the alto saxophone
Subcontrabass tubax, two octaves below the tenor saxophone
Contrabassoon, an octave below the bassoon
Contraforte, a recently invented proprietary wide-bore variant of the contrabassoon with a more powerful tone and an upward pointing bell
Reed contrabass
Contrabassophone
Slide reed subcontrabass

Other
Contrabass harmonica
Contrabass singer, basso profondo or oktavist, a rare sub-bass, classical singer who performs notes in the contrabass octave

String

Bowed
Double bass,  a contrabass viol
Violone, or contrabass violin
Octobass
Triple contrabass viol
Dalaruan, used in the modern Chinese orchestra
Dadihu, used in the modern Chinese orchestra

Plucked
Acoustic bass guitar
Bass guitar
Contrabass guitar
Subcontrabass guitar
Contrabass balalaika, a large triangular lute used in traditional Russian folk music
Guitarrón, a Mexican acoustic bass guitar used in mariachi ensembles
Chitarrone moderno, a plucked bass type designed around 1900 by Italian luthiers for use in a mandolin orchestra
Contrabass ukulele, typically marketed as the Kala U-Bass

Notes

External links
www.contrabass.com, the "Contrabass Mania" site dedicated to low instruments